James Harold Fanning (born August 6, 1942) is an American professional wrestler better known by his ring name Jimmy Valiant.

Early life 
Fanning was born in Tullahoma as the youngest of five children of James and Effie Fanning. He later incorporated the names of his four sisters – Louise, Christine, Charlena and Patrica – into the spider web tattoo on his upper arm.

Professional wrestling career
Fanning started wrestling in 1964 as "Big Jim Vallen". He went to the World Wide Wrestling Federation in the 1970s as "Handsome Jimmy Valiant" and formed a team with Johnny Valiant that would dominate the tag team scene for a while as WWWF Tag Team champions. In the later 1960s in the WWA, they were managed by Bobby Heenan.

Valiant had entered the WWWF in 1971 as a babyface, originally known as "Gentleman Jim Valiant," but quickly switched to heel. He had title matches against champion Pedro Morales in secondary arenas, such as Philadelphia, and feuded with short-term tag partner Chief Jay Strongbow. Jimmy and his kayfabe brother Johnny held the tag belts from 1974 to 1975 and main evented Madison Square Garden against Chief Jay Strongbow and Bruno Sammartino (Strongbow and Sammartino won 2 out of 3 falls, but one fall via disqualification; hence the belts didn't change hands).

During the late 1970s – early 1980s, Valiant was a central player in the Memphis, Tennessee wrestling scene. He feuded regularly with Jerry Lawler and teamed with Bill Dundee to dominate the tag team matches of that time. He even recorded a song, "The Ballad of Handsome Jimmy", which was used in wrestling arenas as his entry music and became a mainstay on some Memphis radio stations for a few years. Despite the Memphis promotion desperately wanting to keep him in Memphis full-time, even offering to buy him a house in Memphis according to Jerry Lawler's biography, Valiant decided to move on after holding the AWA Southern Heavyweight title for roughly a year. Valiant also spent a brief amount of time in Jim Crockett Promotions in the late 1970s as the heel "King James Valiant" managed by Lord Alfred Hayes.

In 1979, Jimmy returned to the WWWF with Johnny occasionally wrestling and went into the manager role. He managed Johnny and Jerry Valiant as they won the tag belts.

In the early 1980s, Valiant returned as a babyface to NWA's Jim Crockett Promotions as "Boogie Woogie Man" Jimmy Valiant and called his fans "the Street People". His theme music around this time was "Boy From New York City", by The Manhattan Transfer. While in Jim Crockett Promotions, he would sometimes appear in a black bandit-style mask and call himself "Charlie Brown from Outta Town". This usually occurred when Valiant was (in kayfabe) banned from wrestling. Charlie Brown was billed as someone other than Valiant, despite "Brown" having Valiant's legendarily prodigious beard.

January 1984, Valiant was attacked by Paul Jones and The Assassins. They tied him to the wrestling ring ropes so that Jones could cut his beard off. This led to a grudge match with hyped supershow called 'Boogie Man Jam '84' in Greensboro, North Carolina. For this match, Dusty Rhodes was in Valiant's corner and tied by a rope to Paul Jones. Valiant defeated Assassin II, who was unmasked and revealed as Hercules Hernandez. Due to the beard cutting attack,  he feuded heavily with Paul Jones and his army of wrestlers, from 1984 through to late 1986. This army of wrestlers included The Barbarian, Baron von Raschke, Teijo Khan, and The Assassins. During this three-year feud, Valiant received help from Héctor Guerrero and "Raging Bull" Manny Fernandez. Although Jimmy Valiant would lose a Loser Leaves Town Tuxedo Street Fight to Paul Jones at Starrcade 1984 in Greensboro, North Carolina the feud with many from the Paul Jones stable continued, which would come to include Abdullah The Butcher. In 1985, Valiant and Ragin' Bull Manny Fernandez formed a team called B and B Connection ("Boogie Woogie" and "Bull").

During The Great American Bash 1986 summer shows, Paul Jones adopted a military style look in his long feud with Valiant and labeled his stable of wrestlers The Army. Valiant would beat Shaska Whatley in a hair vs hair match, but with outside interference lost a hair vs hair match to Paul Jones only weeks later. In the fall of 1986, The Ragin Bull Manny Fernandez, Valiant's best friend accepted Jones' money and turned on Valiant, starting a feud between the two. Paul Jones at this point shortened his army to his newly acquired tag team of Ragin Bull and Rick Rude. The war between Valiant and Paul Jones climaxed at Starrcade 1986 with Valiant putting up the hair of his valet Big Mama against the hair of Paul Jones in a No DQ Match which Valiant won (while the Ragin Bull was placed in a cage above the ring).

In the late 1980s, he teamed with Hector Guerrero (then masked as Laser Tron) and Bugsy McGraw and feuded with The New Breed. When Jim Crockett Promotions became WCW, Valiant left and returned to Memphis to wrestle in the USWA. In 1990 he twice won the USWA Unified World Heavyweight Championship from Jerry Lawler, losing it back to him both times.

His last match was for WrestlePro in Rahway, New Jersey, where he teamed with Buster Jackson to defeat the team of Colt Cabana and CPA on February 8, 2020.

He now enjoys his time with his wife Angel and training wrestlers at Boogie's Wrestling Camp located in Shawsville, Virginia. Jimmy currently wrestles under the ACW Banner (American Championship Wrestling) around the Roanoke Virginia Area. He has also recently wrestled with George South, Stan Lee and Ricky Morton in ASW Wrestling and New OCW in Ashland, KY with Matty B and Violet Rayne against Beau and Misty James and Scotty Ace.

Valiant remains in the wrestling world today with continuing to appear at independent shows signing autographs while his students appear in a few matches on the card. He keeps in touch with fans through his official Weekly website.

Most recently, Valiant lent his name to a foreword for a fiction novel called "Only The Beginning". It is a book set in the 1980s about a girl's life during high school. While the book is not wrestling related, the author Jason Strecker is a personal friend of Valiant's and in the forward Valiant responds to his friendship with the author along with the book's message of being of strong character and doing positive actions for others. The book also has a foreword by Nikolai Volkoff.

On May 14, 2022, Valiant came out of retirement at nearly 80 years old winning a 6 man tag team match at Patriotic Wrestling Federation in York, South Carolina.

Personal life
Fanning married Clara, with whom he fathered three children: Robin, Rhonda, and Dana. Rhonda passed away in 2016. With Monika, he has his first son Todd. With Felicia, he has his youngest son Handsome. He is now married to Angel. He has 6 grandchildren: Lonna, Jenae, Beau, Chassie, Clarissa and Delilah.

Bibliography 
 "Woo...Mercy Daddy!" Welcome to My World: The Jimmy Valiant Story (2005)

Championships and accomplishments
All-American Wrestling
AAW Heavyweight Championship (5 times)
All Pro Wrestling
APW Heavyweight Championship (1 time)
Allied Independent Wrestling Federations
AIWF Hall Of Fame (Class Of 2016) 
AIWF Mid-Atlantic Tag Team Championship (1 time) – with Rob Mcbride http://www.wrestling-titles.com/us/nc/aiwf/aiwf-ma-t.html
American Championship Wrestling
ACW Universal Tag Team Championship (1 time) – with Bob Ross
Big Time Wrestling (San Francisco)
NWA World Tag Team Championship (San Francisco version) (1 time) – with Johnny Valiant
Cauliflower Alley Club
Other honoree (1997)
Championship Pro Wrestling
CPW Heavyweight Championship (1 time)
Championship Wrestling from Florida
NWA Florida Tag Team Championship (1 time) – with Johnny Valiant
NWA United States Tag Team Championship (Florida version) (1 time) – with Johnny Valiant
Georgia Championship Wrestling
NWA Georgia Tag Team Championship (1 time) – with Johnny Valiant
Maple Leaf Wrestling
NWA Television Championship (Toronto version) (2 times)
Mid-Atlantic Championship Wrestling
NWA Television Championship (2 times)
National Wrestling Alliance
NWA Legends Hall of Heroes (2016)
 North American Wrestling Alliance
NAWA Heavyweight Championship (1 time)
NAWA Tag Team Championship |1 time) – with Hangman Bruce Pobanz
New England Pro Wrestling Hall of Fame
Class of 2018
 Northern Wrestling Federation
NWF Heavyweight Championship (1 time)
NWA Mid-America / Continental Wrestling Association
AWA Southern Heavyweight Championship (5 times)
AWA Southern Tag Team Championship (1 time) – with Rocky Johnson
CWA Tag Team Championship (3 times) – with Bill Dundee (2) and Don Carson (1)
NWA Mid-America Heavyweight Championship (1 time)
NWA Southern Heavyweight Championship (Memphis version) (1 time)
Pro Wrestling Illustrated
PWI Tag Team of the Year award in 1974 – with Johnny Valiant
PWI ranked him # 274 of the 500 best singles wrestlers during the "PWI Years" in 2003.
Southern Championship Wrestling
SCW Hall of Fame (Class of 1997)
United States Wrestling Association
USWA Southern Heavyweight Championship (1 time)
USWA Unified World Heavyweight Championship (2 times)
World Wide Wrestling Federation / World Wrestling Federation
WWWF World Tag Team Championship (1 time) – with Johnny Valiant
Cadillac Tournament winner (1)
WWF Hall of Fame (Class of 1996)
World Wrestling Association
WWA World Heavyweight Championship (1 time)
WWA World Tag Team Championship (4 times) – with Johnny Valiant
Wrestling Observer Newsletter
Worst Tag Team (1987) with Bugsy McGraw

References

External links 

 
 
 

1942 births
20th-century professional wrestlers
American male professional wrestlers
Living people
NWA Georgia Tag Team Champions
NWA United States Tag Team Champions (Florida version)
NWA/WCW World Television Champions
People from Franklin County, Tennessee
People from Shawsville, Virginia
People from Willingboro Township, New Jersey
Professional wrestlers from Tennessee
Sportspeople from Hammond, Indiana
The Heenan Family members
USWA Unified World Heavyweight Champions
WWE Hall of Fame inductees